Vladimir Arutyunian (born 12 March 1978) is a Georgian national who attempted to assassinate United States President George W. Bush and Georgian President Mikheil Saakashvili by throwing a hand grenade at them on 10 May 2005. The attempt failed when the grenade did not detonate. He was later arrested and sentenced to life in prison.

Background
Vladimir Arutyunian, a Georgian citizen and ethnic Armenian, was born on 12 March 1978 in Tbilisi, Soviet Georgia. Arutyunian lost his father at an early age and lived with his mother, who was a stall-holder at the local street market. They lived in one of the poorest suburbs of Tbilisi. After completing his secondary education, he had no fixed occupation.

He joined the Democratic Union for Revival party led by Aslan Abashidze in January 2004, but soon after left the organization's ranks. He joined the Revival party in the same month Mikheil Saakashvili became president of Georgia and had led Adjara in a crisis by refusing to obey the central government authorities. Saakashvili and his party were considered to be pro-United States, while Abashidze and his party were considered to be pro-Russia. The crisis ended in 2004 without bloodshed.

Assassination attempt 

On 10 May 2005, Arutyunian waited for the United States President George W. Bush and Georgian President Mikheil Saakashvili to speak in Tbilisi's central Liberty Square. When Bush began speaking, Arutyunian threw a Soviet-made RGD-5 hand grenade, wrapped in a red tartan handkerchief, toward the podium where Bush stood as he addressed the crowd. The grenade landed  from the podium, near where Saakashvili, his wife Sandra E. Roelofs, Laura Bush, and other officials were seated.

The grenade failed to detonate. Although original reports indicated that the grenade was not live, it was later revealed that it was. After Arutyunian pulled the pin and threw the grenade, it hit a girl, cushioning its impact. The red handkerchief remained wrapped around the grenade, and it prevented the striker lever from releasing. A Georgian security officer quickly removed the grenade, and Arutyunian disappeared.

Arutyunian later said that he threw the grenade "towards the heads" so that "the shrapnel would fly behind the bulletproof glass". Bush and Saakashvili did not learn of the incident until after the rally.

Investigation 
On 18 July 2005 Georgia's Interior Minister Vano Merabishvili issued photos of an unidentified suspect and announced a reward of 150,000 lari (US$80,000) for information leading to the suspect's identification.

At the request of the Georgian government, the US Federal Bureau of Investigation began an investigation into the incident. Extra manpower was brought in from the surrounding region to help with the investigation. In one picture of the crowd, the FBI noted a man in the bleachers with a large camera. He was a visiting professor from Boise, Idaho. FBI agents contacted him and, with his photographs, were able to identify a suspect.

Arrest 
On 20 July 2005, acting on a tip from a hotline, police raided Arutyunian's home where he lived with his mother. During an ensuing gunfight, Arutyunian killed the head of the Interior Ministry's counterintelligence department, Zurab Kvlividze. He then fled into the woods in the village of Vashlijvari on the outskirts of Tbilisi. After being wounded in the leg, he was captured by Georgia's anti-terror unit.

DNA samples from Arutyunian matched the DNA samples from the handkerchief. Georgian police later found a chemical lab and a stockpile of explosives, chemicals and other material Arutyunian had built up in his apartment. Twenty liters (5.3 U.S. gallons) of sulfuric acid, several drawers full of mercury thermometers, a microscope, and "enough dangerous substances to carry out several terrorist acts" were found.

Trial 

After his arrest, Arutyunian was shown on television admitting from his hospital bed that he had thrown the grenade. He said that he had attempted to assassinate both presidents because he hated Georgia's new government for being a "puppet" of the United States. He further stated that he did not regret what he did and would do it again if he had the chance.

Arutyunian initially admitted his guilt when arrested but refused to cooperate during the trial. He pleaded not guilty, then refused to answer questions in court. His lawyer Elisabed Japaridze said after the conviction and sentencing that she would appeal. "I consider that everything was far from proved." She cited the fact that Arutyunian's fingerprints were not found on the grenade. However, prosecutor Anzor Khvadagiani said that the grenade being wrapped in cloth explained the lack of distinguishable fingerprints and also that DNA tests of material found on the cloth matched Arutyunian's.

Prison sentence
On 11 January 2006 a Georgian court sentenced Arutyunian to life imprisonment for the attempted assassination of George Bush and Mikheil Saakashvili, and the killing of Officer Kvlividze. In September 2005, a United States federal grand jury also indicted Arutyunian, and could ask to extradite him if he is ever released. He is not eligible for parole, and could only be released under a presidential pardon, but such pardons are almost never granted in Georgia.

See also
List of United States presidential assassination attempts and plots

References

1978 births
Living people
Criminals from Tbilisi
21st-century criminals
People convicted of attempted murder
Failed assassins of presidents of the United States
Converts to Islam from Eastern Orthodoxy
Georgian people of Armenian descent
Muslims from Georgia (country)
Prisoners from Georgia (country) sentenced to life imprisonment
Prisoners sentenced to life imprisonment by Georgia (country)